Manifest is a 2010 Linda Sundblad album.

Track listing
Choice
Making Out
Let's Dance
It's Alright!
Perfect Nobody (Feat. Fibes! Oh Fibes!)
To All My Girls
Serotonin
Suicide Girl
Pick Up The Pieces
Damage
History (Feat. Kleerup)
Feel So Good

Chart positions

References

2010 albums
Linda Sundblad albums